Trisyllabic laxing, or trisyllabic shortening, is any of three processes in English in which tense vowels (long vowels or diphthongs) become lax (short monophthongs) if they are followed by two or more syllables, at least the first of which is unstressed, for example, grateful vs gratitude, profound vs profundity.

By a different process, laxing is also found in disyllabic and monosyllabic words, for example, shade vs shadow, lose vs lost.

Trisyllabic laxing
Trisyllabic laxing is a process which has occurred at various periods in the history of English:
The earliest occurrence of trisyllabic laxing occurred in late Old English and caused stressed long vowels to become shortened before clusters of two consonants when two or more syllables followed.
Later in Middle English, the process was expanded to all vowels when two or more syllables followed.
The Middle English sound change remained in the language and is still a mostly-productive process in Modern English, detailed in Chomsky and Halle's The Sound Pattern of English.

The Middle English sound change occurred before the Great Vowel Shift and other changes to the nature of vowels. As a result of the changes, the pairs of vowels related by trisyllabic laxing often bear little resemblance to one another in Modern English; however, originally they always bore a consistent relationship.

In some cases, trisyllabic laxing appears to take place when it should not have done so: for example, in "south"  vs. "southern" . In such cases, the apparent anomaly is caused by later sound changes: "southern" (formerly southerne) was pronounced  when trisyllabic laxing applied.

In the modern English language, there are systematic exceptions to the process, such as in words ending in -ness: "mindfulness, loneliness". There are also occasional, non-systematic exceptions such as "obese, obesity" (not *), although in this case the former was back-formed from the latter in the 19th century.

Disyllabic laxing
Several now-defunct Middle English phonological processes have created an irregular system of disyllabic laxing; unlike trisyllabic laxing which was one phonological change, apparent disyllabic laxing in Modern English is caused by many different sound changes:

 please → pleasant 
 shade → shadow 
 pale → pallid 
 child → children 
 dine → dinner  
 divide → division 
 south → southern  
 out → utter 
 goose → gosling 
 fool → folly 
 cone → conic  (and other words in -ic)
 depose → deposit 

Many cases of disyllabic laxing are due, as in southern and shadow above, to Middle English having had more unstressed  sounds than Modern English: sutherne , schadowe . Cases such as please, pleasant and dine, dinner come from how French words were adapted into Middle English: a stressed French vowel was borrowed into English as an equivalent long vowel. However, if the stressed English vowel was originally an unstressed vowel in French, the vowel was not lengthened; an example of this which did not create an alteration is OF pitee  → Middle English pite ; Old French plais-  (stem of plaire) → Middle English plesen , plaisant  → plesaunt .

Some Latinate words, such as Saturn, have short vowels where from syllable structure one would expect a long vowel. Other cases differentiate British and American English, with more frequent disyllabic laxing in American English – compare RP and GA pronunciations of era, patent, primer (book), progress (noun) and lever, though there are exceptions such as leisure, yogurt, produce (noun), Tethys and zebra that have a short vowel in RP. On the other hand, American English is less likely to have trisyllabic laxing, for example in words such as privacy, dynasty, patronize and vitamin. Much of this irregularity is due to morphological leveling.

Monosyllabic laxing

Laxing also occurs in basic monosyllabic vocabulary, which presumably helps keep it active across generations. For example, the  →  shift occurs in the past-tense forms of basic verbs such as feel, keep, kneel, mean, sleep, sweep, weep and – without a suffix -t – in feed, read, lead. Other shifts occur in hide → hid, bite → bit, lose → lost, shoot → shot, go → gone, do → done, etc.

References

Sources
 
 
 
 
 Myers, Scott (1987). "Vowel Shortening in English". Natural Language & Linguistic Theory, Vol. 5, No. 4 (Dec., 1987), pp. 485–518.
 

English phonology
Vowel shifts